Gianluca Gracco (born  19 June 1990) is an Italian footballer who plays as a forward who currently plays for Virtus Volla.

Career
Gracco previously played for Italian amateur side A.S.D. Città di Pompei until the summer of 2012, as the team disbanded as they couldn't secure a playing pitch for the current season. On 26 December 2012, he signed non-contract terms with Football League Two side Dagenham & Redbridge, after impressing on trial. On 31 January 2013, he signed a permanent 18-month contract with the club. He made his professional debut with the Daggers on 1 April 2013, in a 4–2 home league defeat to Bristol Rovers, replacing Gavin Hoyte as a late substitute. On 11 September 2013, Gracco had his contract terminated by mutual consent as he felt his opportunities with the club were limited.

Career statistics

References

External links

1990 births
Living people
Footballers from Naples
Italian footballers
Association football forwards
Dagenham & Redbridge F.C. players
English Football League players